The Players is a 2012 omnibus comedy film starring Jean Dujardin and Gilles Lellouche, with each of them also directing and writing a segment.

Plot 
Series of vignettes about the theme of male infidelity and its adulterous variants.

Controversy 
The posters for the film on which Jean Dujardin and Gilles Lellouche can be seen in suggestive positions (like gripping a pair of naked female legs) attracted accusations of sexism. The French professional authority of regulation for advertising received four official complaints accusing the posters of sexism. Following this controversy, the posters were taken down, and the distributor apologized.

Jean Dujardin refers to I mostri by Dino Risi.

The original copy of the film included a scene where a man talks to a woman while a plane crashes into the World Trade Center. Reportedly, this scene has been censored to have better chances to get an Academy Award for Jean Dujardin (who went on to win the award for his leading role in The Artist).

Cast 
 Jean Dujardin as Fred / Olivier / François / Laurent / James 
 Gilles Lellouche as Greg / Nicolas / Bernard / Antoine / Eric
 Lionel Abelanski as the director
 Guillaume Canet as Thibault
 Charles Gérard as Richard
 Sandrine Kiberlain as Marie-Christine
 Dolly Golden as the mistress
  as the emergency doctor
  as Maxime's mother
 Alexandra Lamy as Lisa
  as the waiter
 Mathilda May as Ariane
 Géraldine Nakache as Stéphanie
 Isabelle Nanty as Christine
  as Nathalie
 Manu Payet as Simon
 Clara Ponsot: Inès
 Hélène Seuzaret as Isabelle, Éric's wife
  as Benjamin 
  as Julie
 Bastien Bouillon as Valentin

Remake 

An Italian remake of the same name was released in 2020.

References

External links

2012 comedy films
2012 films
Films directed by Michel Hazanavicius
Films directed by Emmanuelle Bercot
French anthology films
French comedy films
Obscenity controversies in film
Advertising and marketing controversies in film
Film controversies in France
Adultery in films
2010s French films
2010s French-language films